Paul Van Valkenburgh is an American journalist and author, best known for his work in the field of auto racing.  His last name is sometimes abbreviated "VanValkenburgh".  He bears no immediate relation to Paul Van Valkenburgh of Ormond Beach, Florida who claimed to have written the song "Itsy Bitsy Teenie Weenie Yellow Polka Dot Bikini".

Magazines
Van Valkenburgh had a regular column in Racecar Engineering Magazine and also freelanced for magazines such as Road & Track, Corvette Fever, Grassroots Racing, and Drag Racer.

Published works
Race Car Engineering and Mechanics
The Unfair Advantage (with Mark Donohue)
Chevrolet – Racing?  14 Years of Raucous Silence
Auto 2010

References

External links
Official site

American sportswriters
Living people
Place of birth missing (living people)
Year of birth missing (living people)